This is an incomplete list of television series produced in Lebanon in chronological order. For an A-Z list of films currently on Wikipedia, see :Category:Lebanese television series.

1960s

1970s

1980s

1990s

2000s

2010s

References

Arabic-language television stations
Television stations in Lebanon
Arab mass media
Lebanese television series
Lists of mass media in Lebanon